163693 Atira , provisional designation , is a stony asteroid, dwelling in the interior of Earth's orbit. It is classified as a near-Earth object. Atira is a binary asteroid, a system of two asteroids orbiting their common barycenter. Atira was discovered on 11 February 2003, by astronomers with the Lincoln Near-Earth Asteroid Research at Lincoln Laboratory's Experimental Test Site near Socorro, New Mexico, in the United States.

It is the namesake and the first numbered body of the Atira asteroids, a new subclass of near-Earth asteroids, which have their orbits entirely within that of Earth and are therefore alternatively called Interior-Earth Objects (IEO). As of 2019, there are only 36 known members of the Atira group of asteroids. Atiras are similar to the larger group of Aten asteroids, as both are near-Earth objects and both have a semi-major axis smaller than that of Earth (< 1.0 AU). However, and contrary to Aten asteroids, the aphelion for Atiras is always smaller than Earth's perihelion (< 0.983 AU), which means that they do not approach Earth as close as Atens do in general.

Physical properties 
Atira is a S-type asteroid and orbits the Sun at a distance of 0.5–1.0 AU once every 8 months (233 days). Its orbit has an eccentricity of 0.32 and an inclination of 26° with respect to the ecliptic. With a perihelion of 0.50 AU the body also classifies as a Venus-crosser as Venus orbits the Sun at a distance of 0.72–0.73 AU but does not get as close to the Sun as Mercury (which orbits between 0.31 and 0.47 AU). As no precoveries were found, Atiras observation arc begins with its discovery observation in 2003. It has a rotation period of 3.3984 hours with a brightness variation of 0.36 magnitude and a very low albedo of 0.0231.

With a diameter of 4.8 kilometers, Atira is one of the largest Near-Earth objects. Early estimates of its size ranged from 1 to 2 kilometers, but those were based on an assumed higher albedo of 0.20. Its larger size and low albedo were discovered when Atira was imaged by radar in early 2017. These radar images also revealed that Atira is a binary asteroid.

Binary system 

Atira came within  from Earth in January 2017, the closest since its discovery in 2003. This provided an opportunity to study the asteroid by radar. Images taken at Arecibo Observatory on 20 January 2017 revealed that Atira is a synchronous binary asteroid with a minor-planet moon in orbit. Additional images taken on 23 January 2017 showed that the two components are orbiting each other at a distance of about 6 km with an orbital period of 15.5 hours.

Atira class 
Knowing that traditionally the first known object in a new class of asteroids will become the name of the new class of asteroids, due consideration was given to the name for (163693). The other classes of near-Earth asteroids are Amors, Apollos, and Atens (as mentioned above), named after a Roman, Greek, and Egyptian god, so a preference was given to a god or goddess beginning with the letter "A". Given (163693) was discovered by the LINEAR program which operates out of the southwestern United States, preference was also given to a name of local origin. The minor planet was named after Atira , an epithet of the Earth goddess of the Native American Pawnee people. Atira is the wife of the creator god, Tirawa, and goddess of Earth and the evening star. The official naming citation was published by the Minor Planet Center on 22 January 2008.

See also 
 594913 ꞌAylóꞌchaxnim

References

External links 
 Photo at klet.org
 Facts Sheet (163693) Atira, European Asteroid Research Node (EARN)
 Asteroid Lightcurve Database (LCDB), query form (info )
 Dictionary of Minor Planet Names, Google books
 Asteroids with Satellites, Robert Johnston, johnstonsarchive.net
 Discovery Circumstances Numbered Minor Planets (160001)–(165000)
 
 

163693
163693
Named minor planets
163693
163693
20030211